Iker Romero Fernández (born 15 June 1980 in Vitoria, Álava, Basque Country, Spain) is a retired Spanish handball player, currently working as the head coach of SG BBM Bietigheim.

He won the World Men's Handball Championship in 2005 with the Spain men's national handball team in Tunisia.

External links

Escuela de Balonmano Iker Romero
Federación Alavesa de Balonmano

1980 births
Living people
Sportspeople from Vitoria-Gasteiz
Spanish male handball players
Spanish expatriate sportspeople in Germany
Liga ASOBAL players
FC Barcelona Handbol players
Handball players at the 2008 Summer Olympics
Olympic handball players of Spain
Olympic bronze medalists for Spain
CB Ademar León players
BM Ciudad Real players
BM Valladolid players
Olympic medalists in handball
Medalists at the 2008 Summer Olympics
Handball players from the Basque Country (autonomous community)